William Robert Ashley Birch Reynardson CBE (7 December 1923 – 4 July 2017) was a South African-born British barrister who was instrumental in the development of maritime law. He was vice-president of the Comité Maritime International and chairman of the Garsington Opera.

He was the son of Lt-Col Henry Thomas Birch Reynardson (1892-1972), and married Pamela Matnika in 1950 (1923-1997), the daughter of Lt-Gen Sir Edward Thomas Humphreys KCB CMG DSO (1878-1955) and Dorothy Grace Penton (1891-1967).
 
His home was Adwell House, Oxfordshire, the family seat of the Birch Reynardsons.

Publications
Letters to Lorna. Wilton 65, Windsor, 2008. 
Survivors: A story in letters of an English family's survival during four centuries of wars. Adwell Press, 2014.

References

External links

English barristers
1923 births
2017 deaths
Commanders of the Order of the British Empire
People educated at The Dragon School
British Army officers
British Army personnel of World War II
Bill
High Sheriffs of Oxfordshire
20th-century English lawyers
South African emigrants to the United Kingdom